Craig R. McClanahan is a programmer and original author of the Apache Struts framework for building web applications. He was part of the expert group that defined the servlet 2.2, 2.3 and JSP 1.1, 1.2 specifications. He is also the architect of Tomcat's servlet container Catalina.

External links
 Craig McClanahan's weblog
 LinkedIn
 Jive Software
 Apache

1953 births
Living people
American computer programmers
Sun Microsystems people